The Civil Code of 1734 (Swedish: 1734 års lag), was passed by the Swedish Riksdag of the Estates in 1734, and put in effect after it had been ratified by Frederick I of Sweden 23 January 1736. It became the foundation of the later civil code in Sweden – including Österland, which became Finland when  annexed by Russia in 1809; though many alterations have been made in both Sweden and Finland since. The current Swedish Code of Statutes is founded on the civil code of 1734.

The Civil Code of 1734 replaced the previous Kristofers landslag (The National Law of Christopher) from 1442, and the Stadslagen (The City Law) from 1347–57. It was the first civil code to apply the same law to all of Sweden. Previously, the Kristofers landslag referred to the Medieval Scandinavian law concerning the countryside, which could vary depending on the county, or the Stadslagen concerning the cities. There was a need to establish a civil code and laws applying to all Sweden, both cities and countryside. The work with a national civil code begun during the Swedish Empire in 1686, although its completion was delayed during the Great Northern War. The Civil Code is therefore more influenced by the 17th-century Carolean age rather than the Age of Enlightenment or the Age of liberty of the 1730s. It was translated to the Finnish language in 1738, though not published in it until 1759.

It is divided into the following Books  ( Swedish : "balkar" )

 The Book of Marriage  
 The Book of Parents
 The Book of Inheritance
 The Book of Land
 The Book of Building
 The Book of Commerce
 The Book of Crimes
 The Book of Judicial Procedure
 The Book of execution of Judgments

References

Sources
 Nationalencyklopedin (NE)

1734 books
1734 in law
1734 in Sweden
Political history of Sweden
Political history of Finland
18th century in Finland
18th century in Sweden
Legal history of Sweden
Legal history of Finland
Sweden during the Age of Liberty